The Further Education and Training Act 2007 (c 25) is an Act of the Parliament of the United Kingdom. It implements recommendations made in the White Paper "Further Education: Raising Skills, Improving Life Chances".

Section 32 - Commencement
Orders made under this section:
The Further Education and Training Act 2007 (Commencement No. 1 and Transitional Provisions) Order 2007 (S.I. 2007/3505 (C.151))
The Further Education and Training Act 2007 (Commencement No. 1) (England and Wales) Order 2008 (S.I. 2008/1065 (C.49))
The Further Education and Training Act 2007 (Commencement No. 1) (England) Order 2008 (S.I. 2008/313 (C.12))
The Further Education and Training Act 2007 (Commencement No. 1) (Wales) Order 2007 (S.I. 2007/3565 (W.315))
The Further Education and Training Act 2007 (Commencement No. 2) (Wales) Order 2008 (S.I. 2008/983 (W.108))

See also
Education Act

References
Halsbury's Statutes,

External links
The Further Education and Training Act 2007, as amended from the National Archives.
The Further Education and Training Act 2007, as originally enacted from the National Archives.
Explanatory notes to the Further Education and Training Act 2007.

United Kingdom Acts of Parliament 2007